Thyella is a Greek word about the storm.
The term Thyella also may refer to:
Thyella Patras F.C., sport club based in Patras
Thyella Rafina F.C., sport club based in Rafina
Thyella Filotas F.C., sport club based in Filotas